For exact dates in the Gregorian calendar see Jewish and Israeli holidays 2000–2050.

Public holidays in Israel are national holidays officially recognized by the Knesset, Israel's parliament. The State of Israel has adopted most traditional religious Jewish holidays as part of its national calendar, while also having established new modern holiday observances since its founding in 1948. Of the religious and modern holidays below, some are bank holidays / national holidays requiring all schools, government institutions, financial sector, and most retailers in Jewish Israeli society to be closed, while other holidays are marked as days of note or memorial remembrances with no breaks in public or private sector activities.

As is the case with all religious Jewish holidays, most public holidays in Israel generally begin and end at sundown, and follow the Hebrew calendar. Because of this, most holidays in Israel fall on a different Gregorian calendar date each year, which syncs every 19 years with the Hebrew calendar.

Shabbat, the weekly Sabbath day of rest, in Israel begins every Friday evening just before sundown, ending Saturday evening just after sundown. Most of the Israeli workforce, including schools, banks, public transportation, government offices, and retailers within Jewish Israeli society are shut down during these approximately 25 hours, with some non-Jewish retailers and most non-kosher restaurants still open.

Table

See also
 Jewish holidays
 Jewish and Israeli holidays 2000–2050 with Gregorian calendar dates

References

External links
 National holidays in Israel (2013)
 Public Holidays, Israel, World Travel Guide

 
Israeli culture
Israel
Society of Israel
Holidays